The Province Galley (1696–1717) was a small armed ketch that was a provincial navy vessel constructed by Anglo-American officials in Massachusetts. This was an early example of a proto-American navy. It had ten guns.  For most of the twenty years, the vessel was commanded by Cyprian Southack.  Launched 1 June 1694, the vessel was deployed throughout King William's War and Queen Anne's War.  In 1696, the Province Galley was under the command of Col. John Hathorne who participated in the Siege of Fort Nashwaak (1696).  The first vessel was replaced by a vessel of the same name and launched on April 2, 1705, which was larger at 24 guns with 74 foot keel.  Captain William Pickering (1670 – c. 1723) commanded the Province Galley from 1709–1711. In the British National Archives at Kew, there is a pay-book for the Province Galley, which is interesting considering it was a provincial navy, rather than a Royal Navy, vessel.

References 

 Harriet Silverster Tapley. The Province Galley of Massachusetts By, 1694-1716. Salem Massachusetts, 1922.

History of Maine
1690s ships